HJT may refer to:
 Al Rais Cargo, an Emirati airline
 HijackThis, a malicious software removal tool
 Khujirt Airport, in Mongolia